The Borden Mines Superintendent's House was built in 1850 in Frostburg, Allegany County, Maryland.  The Italianate style villa was built for Albert C. Green, first superintendent of the Borden Mining Company, one of the oldest mining companies in the United States. The frame house, with its three-story tower was one of the first of this style to appear in Allegany County.

References

External links
, including 1982 photo, at Maryland Historical Trust

Houses completed in 1850
Houses on the National Register of Historic Places in Maryland
Houses in Allegany County, Maryland
National Register of Historic Places in Allegany County, Maryland